"Justify My Love" is a song by American singer Madonna from her first greatest hits album, The Immaculate Collection (1990). The song was written by Lenny Kravitz and Ingrid Chavez, with additional lyrics by Madonna; Kravitz also produced the song alongside André Betts. It was released as the lead single from The Immaculate Collection on November 6, 1990, by Sire and Warner Bros. Records. Chavez was not credited on the song, which led to a lawsuit against Kravitz, eventually reaching an out-of-court settlement. Musically considered as a hip hop dance and experimental pop track, it features spoken word vocals by Madonna and was described as a "spoken-word ode to releasing your inner freak", touching on sexual fantasies and implying the position of a woman as the one sexually in control. 

The song's commercial release was accompanied by different remixes; "The Beast Within" remix was condemned as anti-semitic by some Jewish organizations. "Justify My Love" received generally positive reviews by music critics, who appreciated Madonna and Kravitz's collaboration as well as its sensual nature, and was retrospectively noted as one of Madonna's best singles. The song was a commercial success, becoming Madonna's ninth number-one single on the US Billboard Hot 100, and also peaked at number one in Canada and Finland; it also reached the top-five on several countries including Australia, Italy, Netherlands, Switzerland and the United Kingdom.

The accompanying music video, directed by Jean-Baptiste Mondino, is a tribute to the film Bay of Angels (1963). It features Madonna's then-boyfriend Tony Ward and portrays the singer as a woman walking in a hotel hallway, looking distressed and tired from work, until being seduced into having sex with a mysterious man and woman. The video contained imagery of sadomasochism, voyeurism and bisexuality, and was subsequently banned from MTV and other networks internationally due to its sexually explicit nature. The clip was later released as a video single and became the first-ever short-form video to be certified multiplatinum by the Recording Industry Association of America (RIAA).

"Justify My Love" and its "The Beast Within" remix have been included on four of Madonna's concert tours, most recently on the 2015–16 Rebel Heart Tour. It was covered and sampled a number of times by artists such as Vita, Ashanti and Jay-Z. The music video was parodied on a episode of Saturday Night Live and was also seen by critics as feminist, as well as considered one of the sexiest videos of all time by some publications.

Background and release
By the end of 1990, Madonna was ready to release her first greatest hits collection, titled The Immaculate Collection, after becoming the biggest female singles artist in history, with the most number-one and top-ten hit songs by a woman in both the United States and the United Kingdom. According to J. Randy Taraborrelli, author of Madonna: An Intimate Biography, the release was "much more than a mere collection of Madonna's biggest-selling and most popular songs". The singer relegated it as a "proud landmark" of her career which had progressed upwards since she broke out in the music scene in 1983. Following the completion of the 1990 Blond Ambition World Tour, Madonna began rushing the project aimed to be released in time for the year's Christmas season. On October 13, 1990, Billboard magazine confirmed that Madonna had been working on new material for the album with Shep Pettibone and Lenny Kravitz. The collection had 15 of Madonna's previously released singles, and two new songs, "Justify My Love" and "Rescue Me", were included in order to generate public's interest.

"Justify My Love" was released as the lead single from The Immaculate Collection in the United States on November 6, 1990. It was issued on the United Kingdom on December 1, and in Japan on December 10. The artwork for the single, photographed by Patrick Demarchelier and directed by Jeri Heiden, features a picture of Madonna aggressively leaning forward, wearing a sleeveless waistcoast with her hair scrunched up under a black cap, a aggressive expression on her face and a cigarette hanging out of her lips. Carol Clerk, author of Madonnastyle, opined that "it was a particularly masculine pose; Madonna, at times, could look as butch as the next man". The picture had previously appeared on the cover of a Interview magazine issue which featured an interview with Madonna, and later was removed from the French version of the single. Afterwards, the song was included on Madonna's third greatest hits album Celebration (2009).

Development

"Justify My Love" was written by singer and songwriter Ingrid Chavez as a love letter dedicated to Kravitz, who was having an affair with her at the time. He invited her over a studio where he was producing tracks with André Betts, and then recorded the letter in one take. Kravitz took a master copy of the song to Virgin Records, as their relationship ended some time later. Months later, he told Chavez that Madonna would release "Justify My Love" and asked her to sign a document saying that she would receive 12,5% publishing royalties, but no credit. She eventually signed the paper, and was then invited to meet Madonna in the studio while they mixed the track, and was impressed by how she copied her vocals exactly from the demo version; Chavez thought that "maybe she just felt like she didn't another woman to take credit for the creative style of the vocal". 

Upon the song's release, Chavez filed a lawsuit against them, claiming the only words Kravitz wrote were "justify my love", while Madonna changed one line. It was also reported that she only received a US$500 advance after Kravitz pressured her to sign an agreement surrendering credit and three-quarters of royalties. He admitted that Chavez had written some of the lyrics, but both had agreed not to credit her for personal and professional reasons, and accused her of trying to "make like she did the whole thing" upon the single's success. She responded by stating that the reason was because "he was afraid his wife would think we had a relationship going." They eventually reached an out-of-court settlement whereby she received 12,5% percent of royalties and her name on the next pressings. However, her name does not appear on any compilations containing the song. Betts also sued Kravitz, claiming he was promised co-producer credit and half of any producer's royalties, but received an associate producer's credit and was not paid for his work.

Kravitz recalls that he had been working on demos, and the demo version of "Justify My Love" came up. At first, he thought it was "super-sexy and hard at the same time. I just felt it. I just knew that there was something very special about the track and the minimum quality, because it was so minimal. Just a gut thing". However, he "knew it wasn't for me", but thought it would be perfect for Madonna, and phoned her saying he had a number-one song for her. The same day, they met in New York City, where he played the demo for her. After listening to the song multiple times, Madonna agreed to record the song, and both started working on the track the next day. Kravitz described the recording session as "just the two of us and my engineers, and it happened in one day. It was very quick", adding it was fun and "all very authentic".

Composition
"Justify My Love" was written by Kravitz and Chavez, with additional lyrics by Madonna; he also produced the song alongside André Betts. It was recorded by Henry Hirsch, David Domanich, Andy Cardenas, and Josh Cuervokas at Waterfront Studios in London, and Unique Recording Studios in New York City. Ted Jensen mastered it at Sterling Sound Studios, while it was mixed by Shep Pettibone and Goh Hotoda at Guerilla Studios in London. The mixing of "Justify My Love" was done in QSound which at that time was a new audio filter to create a three-dimensional sound effect. This was employed on all of Madonna's past hits present on The Immaculate Collection.

"Justify My Love" is set in common time with a moderate tempo of 132 beats per minute. Composed in the key of B minor, Madonna's vocal range spans from from A4 to D5. It follows the chord progression of E5–F5–E5–F5 during the opening melody. Musically, it is a hip hop dance, and experimental pop song, which features spoken word vocals by Madonna and "moaning" background vocals by Kravitz. It contains a drum sample of Public Enemy's "Security of the First World" (1988) used initially without consent, and the group threatened to take legal action against both singers; however, music industry members believed the drum beat was sampled from James Brown's single "Funky Drummer" (1970), but these claims were denied by the group's producer, Hank Shocklee. A spokeswoman for Madonna said she never had heard their song and "didn't write the music" for "Justify My Love", while Kravitz dismissed the claims by saying, "It's just one of those beats you find on the floor somewhere."

Lyrically, "Justify My Love" was described as a "spoken-word ode to releasing your inner freak". Madonna starts singing the lines "I wanna kiss you in Paris, I wanna hold your hand in Rome, I wanna run naked in a rainstorm, make love in a train... cross country". The chorus changes its atmosphere, as the singer's breathing vocals initially punctuates the "wanting, needing, waiting" line, which prefaces the doubled-tracked "for you to justify my love", with the words "my love" being repeated in the background. The second verse begins with her uttering "OK", suggesting a move in direction, reflected by the line "I wanna know you... no, not like that". On the next verse, Madonna utters the lines "Talk to me, tell me your dreams / Am I in them? Tell me your fears / Are you scared? Tell me your stories", implying the position of a woman sexually in control, which is reinforced by the line "Poor is the man whose pleasures depend upon the permission of another", with its underlying connotations of domination through the lyrics "Love me, that's right, love me / I wanna be your baby". Scholar Sheila Whiteley noted in her book Women and Popular Music: Sexuality, Identity, and Subjectivity that the song's lyrics "imply an overall focus on sexual fantasy" with "implicit S&M of pleasuring allied to permission", suggesting that certain pleasures need to be justified. 

Taraborrelli described its composition as "rather simple – a funky, drum pattern under a droning, aural synthesizer pad, with Madonna speaking sexy verses over the music, Kravitz casually moaning a melody in the background". In a similar vein, Rikky Rooksby wrote on his book Madonna: The Complete Guide to Her Music that the elements on the song were "simple enough: a drum loop that repeats for the duration of the song, a bass part, and a descending four chord sequence moving from F♯ minor to B minor", whose melody "doesn't exactly go anywhere, but it creates a hypnotic atmosfere which supports the imagery of the lyric". Santiago Fouz-Hernández and Freya Jarman-Ivens, in their book Madonna's Drowned Worlds, stated that it was "far from an ordinary pop song", featuring "a very simple tonal structure and the same bassline", with the same chords repeated over and over. They also noted its "little melodic interest", with Madonna speaking more than she sang through her "distant, remote, 'elsewhere'" androgynous vocals. Tom Breiham from Stereogum later classified "Justify My Love" as "an early example of trip-hop", and pointed out that Madonna deserved credit for "anticipating whole new trends before they even happened."

"The Beast Within"
"Justify My Love" received a remix titled "The Beast Within", and was included on some versions of the single. Musically influenced by Eastern music, the remix featured only the chorus and certain lines of the original song, as most of the verses were replaced by passages from the Book of Revelation from the Bible. At the time, Madonna told The Village Voice that "the beast within" was Saddam Hussein and that the mix was inspired by "the impending war in the Middle East". About a third of the way into the six-minute song, Madonna reads the line "I know your tribulation and your poverty and the slander of those who say that they are Jews, but they are not. They are a Synagogue of Satan", which was deemed anti-semitic by some Jewish organizations. According to Rabbi Abraham Cooper, associate dean of the Simon Wiesenthal Center in Los Angeles, "When we saw those lyrics the alarm bell went off", as "the impact of having America's leading cultural icon say those lyrics can give a powerful tool to bigots." He also commented that "Anti-Semitism is a real problem in America today and an entertainer as big of a blockbuster as Madonna should show some responsibility to such social issues." Cooper sent a letter to the singer's management, and initially asked for the line to be removed from the song. Madonna was reportedly shocked by the controversy, calling the accusations "ridiculous" and stating: "People can say I am an exhibitionist, but no one can ever accuse me of being a racist". She then elaborated that it was "a commentary on evil in general" and "the song is, after all, about love". The rabbi responded that she responded quickly to the issue, and was relieved that she did so.

Critical response

Upon release, "Justify My Love" was met with generally positive responses from music critics. Larry Flick of Billboard magazine gave a positive review, calling it a "brilliantly conceived jam", which would be "devoured by club DJs" and "may test the devotion of top 40 radio programmers". Another review from the same magazine stated that it was a "steamy" collaboration between Madonna and Kravitz, and it had "the juice to become the '90s equivalent of Donna Summer's 'Love To Love You Baby'", and noted that it "strays miles away from the chirpy pop of her past." Chuck Campbell from The Knoxville News-Sentinel said it was "so seductive it makes George Michael's 'I Want Your Sex' and Donna Summer's 'I Feel Love' sound like nursery rhymes." Music & Media staff commented that the "unlikely" collaboration of Madonna and Kravitz was a "marriage made in heaven", as well as "atmospheric, yet brutal in an unconventional manner". On her biography of the singer, author Lucy O'Brien stated that the track "opened up a new creative avenue for Madonna, as she moved into more 'adult' territory". Similarly, Rooksby wrote that "Justify My Love" was a pivotal record for the singer, pointing her musical direction into the 1990s decade, giving her old disco sound "the kiss of death". Selects Andrew Harrison considered the song "breathy, pulsing and overpoweringly sexy", which, along with "Rescue Me", played on Madonna's "ambiguous vulnerability, the disqueting mix of sexual predation and submission that gives Madonna's records an edge where Paula Abdul's just have a verse and chorus". Taraborrelli commented that the track "oozed pungent sex, it was just that passionate", while J.D. Considine of The Baltimore Sun noted its "simmering passion". 

In an album guide for Rolling Stone, "Justify My Love" was described along with "Rescue Me" as "worthy sensual newies" on The Immaculate Collection. Matthew Rettenmund, author of Encyclopedia Madonnica, opined that the track "foreshadowed Madonna’s long-term commitment to explicitly politi-sexual art in the wake of an already suggestive career", and that "it sounded like nothing else on the airwaves at the time". He also opined that along with "Rescue Me", it was disappointing that the tracks were "originated on a best-of" album. Danny Eccleston from Q opined that "Justify My Love" had a "hard-faced sexiness", while Music Week staff called it a "mumbling sexy judderer". For Tony Power of Blender the song was "preposterously sexy", and picked it as one of the standout tracks on The Immaculate Collection. Fouz-Hernández and Jarman-Ivens wrote that Madonna's style of singing on the track seemed controlled and distant, and added that "the background moaning, which is intended to remind the listener of copulation, is a key memorable feature". Writing for Entertainment Weekly, Jim Farber described the song as "some vague, tuneless phrases chanted in Madonna's most breathless voice over a minimal house groove-serves mainly to justify the visuals"; while reviewing The Immaculate Collection, David Browne from the same magazine called it "instantly notorious" but noted that along with "Rescue Me", it did not "[break] new ground for her". In 1992, "Justify My Love" won a ASCAP Pop Music Award for "Most Performed Song".

Retrospective reviews have been positive. While analyzing The Immaculate Collection, Drew Mackie of People consisidered the song a "sexy, daring track that's not quite like anything Madonna had released before." Katharine Birbalsingh from The Daily Telegraph opined that it was an "insistent, sexy trance track". PopCrushs Alexandra Capotorto commented that "Justify My Love" was "perfectly constructed lovemaking music", which "might be oozing sex". James Rose of Daily Review noted that with the song Madonna began "a phase of her career that oscillates between cynical self-exploitation and courageous self-expression. Raunchy videos, explicitly themed lyrics and boudoir beats became de rigueur for the lady now arguably bearing the biggest name in popular music." In a review for Celebration, Eric Henderson of Slant Magazine called the track "aromatic" and "considered by most fans to be among the singer's best work". According to The A.V. Clubs Eric Diaz, it remained "one of Madonna's sexiest bangers, setting the stage not only for her still-underrated Erotica era but her tireless capacity to transform and provoke." Justin Myers from Official Charts Company considered the track "filthy for the time but pretty tame now".  Additionally, "Justify My Love" was classified her 12th best on Madonna's top 20 singles of all time list by Q magazine, as well as placed at number 842 in the list of the "1001 Best Songs Ever" by the same publication.

Chart performance

In the United States, "Justify My Love" debuted at number 46 on the Billboard Hot 100 singles chart, on the issue dated November 17, 1990. Eight weeks later it reached number one, becoming her ninth number-one single on the chart, staying in the summit for two weeks. It also topped Billboards Hot Dance Club Songs, and peaked at number 42 on the Hot R&B/Hip-Hop Songs component charts. On February 22, 1991, the song was certified platinum by the Recording Industry Association of America (RIAA) for shipments of over a million units. In 1991, "Justify My Love" ranked at number 21 on the year-end Billboard Hot 100 chart. In Canada, the song debuted at number 12 on the RPM Singles Chart and reached the top on the week dated February 2, 1991. The track eventually received a gold certification by Music Canada (MC) for shipments of 50,000 copies in the region. 

In Australia, "Justify My Love" debuted on the ARIA Charts at number 14 on December 2, 1990. The next weeks it peaked at number four, staying in the position for two weeks. The single was present for a total of 12 weeks on the chart, and was certified gold by the Australian Recording Industry Association (ARIA) for shipments of 35,000 copies of the single. In New Zealand, the song had a similar run as in Australia, by debuting at number 22 on the RIANZ Singles Chart, and peaking at number five for two consecutive weeks.

In the United Kingdom, the track debuted at number nine on the week ending on December 8, 1990, and reached number two a week later. It was also certified silver by the British Phonographic Industry (BPI). As of August 2017, the song had sold 275,500 copies in the United Kingdom and was Madonna's 23rd best selling single in the region. The song also achieved success in other parts of Europe. In Austria, "Justify My Love" debuted at number 21 on the week of January 13, 1991, before peaking at number nine within a month. On December 17, 1990, the song debuted at number 50 in Germany, eventually peaking at number ten for two weeks. The song debuted at number 16 in Sweden, and reached number eight. In Switzerland it experienced more success, debuting at number 12 on January 13, 1991, and peaking at number three for two weeks. Its commercial performance in the European countries helped it attain a peak of number three on the European Hot 100 Singles chart, on the issue dated January 12, 1991.

Music video

Development

The accompanying music video for "Justify My Love" was filmed within three days in November 1990 at the Royal Monceau Hotel in Paris, France. It was directed by Jean-Baptiste Mondino, who had previously directed the video for "Open Your Heart" (1987). The clip was produced by Philippe Dupuis-Mendel under Bandits, in a co-production with Propaganda Films, with editing by Oliver Gajan, and principal photography by Pascal Lebegue. The video features Madonna's then-boyfriend, Tony Ward, models Amanda Cazalet and Wallis Franken Montana, as well as Jose Gutierez Xtravaganza, who was a dancer on the Blond Ambition World Tour which occurred earlier that year. It is a tribute to the film Bay of Angels (1963). Mondino described the concept of the music video:
I've worked with Madonna a few times now, and there's more to her than people think. She's a great actress. So I wanted to do something less glamorous, less slick, more real. I wanted to put the paparazzi out of work. How can a picture of Madonna and Tony together be surprising when you've already seen them together half-naked in a video? [..] It was very cheap, very easy. It's very real — that's what's so shocking about it. And maybe her kissing a woman... but that's part of our society. And with AIDS, shouldn't we celebrate kissing as a beautiful thing?
Mondino did an experience for the video, locking the entire crew into a hotel for three days, setting no rules, and nobody was allowed to go out. The whole top floor with 15 rooms was rented, and also served as makeup and wardrobe rooms; they had no deadline, as opposed to a regular video. He explained that he did not have any concept, except for the idea that Madonna arrived in the hotel tired and broken, and left full of energy. The director recalled that by the end of it he was unable to differentiate the real from the performed as they were not following a script. He described the shooting as "very quiet, it was very gentle, we were all very sweet to each other", and said "we were talking, chatting, laughing, playing the music, shooting and when people were tired they went to bed". Mondino commented that the last day when he was supposed to go home, he felt strange, and wondered if he had to go back home of not, as he thought it was a dream, and not a video shooting. In 2013, during a Q&A session with Reddit users, Madonna revealed it was her favorite music video to make.

Synopsis

The video was filmed in grainy black and white. It opens with a dancer in a black bodysuit dancing to the camera, as it cuts to Madonna walking down a hotel hallway, looking tired. She is dressing an overcoat, carrying a suitcase, with her hand on her forehead. The ajar doors in the hallway also reveal glimpses of a topless androgynous figure, as well as a shirtless man who appears to be receiving oral sex. As Madonna starts lip synching the song, she drops the suitcase and kneels down against the wall, while caressing her neck. She opens her coat, which reveals she is wearing lace underwear, garter belt and stockings. An out-of-focus male figure, played by Ward, emerges, and slowly walks towards her. As she stands, she pulls Ward towards her and they kiss. 

More images from the doors are also shown, displaying a man in black leather clothes lacing a woman into a corset, as well as a woman wearing a corset who turns to camera thrusting her breasts forward. The video moves into a scene where Madonna is seen in a bedroom, slowly removing her clothes and displaying herself on a white bed as Ward observes her. He comes close to her, undressing himself and preparing to mount her, and she pushes him away. A cut occurs, and Madonna is seen laying down with an androgynous woman, wearing male clothes and make up applied on her eyes. They engage on a kiss as Ward observes as a voyeur. Two transgender women are then seen caressing each other's faces, while observing themselves in a mirror. The video returns to the bedroom scene, where Ward is on top of Madonna and appears to be penetrating her. 

A dominatrix woman enters the bedroom in a cop hat and leather gloves, as well as suspenders covering her nipples. She then grabs Ward by the hair, who is tied up on a chair, wearing a latticed leather harness and leather chaps. Madonna and Ward are back in bed, caressing each other; he is then seen rubbing his face on Madonna's body until it reaches her feet. Women in drag draw thin mustaches on each other and look into the camera, as Madonna laughs in the background, putting her hand onto her mouth. A man holds a woman's face as she makes a fearful look to the camera. Two man are seen sitting on a couch caressing each other while a crossdresser is laying down on their laps. Madonna leaves the hotel hurriedly, holding her suitcase, with Ward reaching out for her to return. She throws her head back as she laughs, with mouth open wide, then bites one of her fingers in disbelief. The video fades to black, and the words "poor is the man whose pleasures depends on the permission of another" appear on the screen.

Release and banning
The video was initially set to premiere on MTV's "Madonnathon" weekend event, of which it was going to be the main attraction. However, the network suddenly announced that it could not be broadcast; on November 29, 1990, MTV's correspondent Kurt Loder explained the reasons: "When MTV programming executives got their first look at the video's steamy bed scenes, gay and lesbian snuggling, S&M and briefly bared female breasts, they decided they couldn't air it". The channel's executives also said in a statement: "We love Madonna; we've had and will continue to have a terrific relationship with her. We respect her work as an artist and think she makes great videos. In its current form, this one is just not for us". It was rejected by its standards committee, which previews all new videos, and requests artists to edit or trim objectionable scenes. According to MTV's vice-president Abbey Konowitch, the network frequently had concerns about the content of the singer's videos, stating, "You take the black lingerie, sex scenes and flesh out of 'Justify My Love,' and you've got 10 seconds of ill-focused dancing." The channel had previously threatened to ban Madonna's music videos from airing — such as "Express Yourself", "Oh Father" (1989) and "Vogue" (1990) — but ultimately broadcast all videos unedited. When "Justify My Love" was submitted, Madonna thought she was "once again going to be able to bend the rules a little bit" after "Vogue" was broadcast; however, MTV simply refused to air it, refusing to even edit the video. The singer stated that "we didn't even really get a chance to try to make it viewable. They rejected it completely". The channel responded by saying, "This decision went all the way to the top. There is no way we could even edit this. I can't believe Madonna ever thought we would air it", sparking suggestions by music industry insiders that the video was designed to be banned, as part of a marketing strategy.

The video was premiered in its entirety on The Jukebox Network, an interactive cable network, on November 29, 1990; it was later aired on ABC's Nightline, on December 3. The channel's lawyers analyzed the video before it was shown, and agreed to its broadcast "because of the news value of the video, the late air time, and the focus of the discussion". Madonna was also interviewed by the show's host Forrest Sawyer about the video's sexual content and censorship. She defended the video as a "celebration of sex" and wondered, "Why is it that people are willing to go and watch a movie about someone getting blown to bits for no reason at all, and nobody wants to see two girls kissing and two men snuggling?" The singer also expressed during the interview that she did not understand why MTV banned the video yet allowed videos that contained violence and degradation to women to continue receiving regular airplay, saying, "I draw the line at violence and humiliation and degradation". Her appearance on Nightline became the show's highest-rated episode for the entire year. Other shows which showed parts of the video also garnered record-breaking ratings, such as Saturday Night Live and CNN's Showbiz Today.

The music video was also banned from regular rotation on MuchMusic and Musique Plus in Canada. John Martin, program director for the former, said it was innapropriate to air, while the latter's program dicrector Pierre Marchand called it a "soft-porn short movie with a message about freedom of choice", and stated that viewers needed to understand before accepting it. The banning led MuchMusic to air a special titled A Question of Taste, where the video was aired in its entirety, accompanied by panel discussions on its artistic and cultural context. In the United Kingdom the video was not banned, however, the Independent Broadcasting Authority determined its airing only after the 9pm watershed. Although many complaints were received, the clip was played without restriction on the Australian Broadcasting Corporation's music video show Rage, as the channel is not bound to follow classification guidelines as it is a public broadcaster. In 2002, the video was aired in its entirety on MTV2 as part of a special countdown showing the most controversial videos ever to air on MTV. The show was broadcast late at night because of the graphic imagery of "Justify My Love" and several other videos on the countdown.

Upon the video's banning, Madonna decided make it available commercially as a video single, marking the first time an artist had released a single in this format in the United States; it was described as a unprecedented move in the video industry. When asked whether she stood to make more money selling the video than airing it on MTV, she answered, "Yeah, so lucky me". The video single was released on December 7, 1990 in the United States, with the retail price of $9.98. The European version also contained Madonna's performance of "Vogue" at the 1990 MTV Video Music Awards. The release peaked at number two on Billboards Top Music Videos for two weeks, and spent 39 weeks on the chart overall. It has been certified four times platinum by the Recording Industry Association of America (RIAA), for shipments of 200,000 units in the United States, and went on to sell over a million copies worldwide, becoming the best selling video single of all time. In the United Kingdom, the video was given an 18 certificate by the British Board of Film Classification (BBFC), meaning no one under that age could legally buy or see the release. It was reported that in Saudi Arabia it was sold at a high price as illegal market porn. The music video was included on the greatest hits package Celebration: The Video Collection (2009); the version included was censored with black bars in a scene that contains female nudity.

Reception and analysis

Caryn James from Tampa Bay Times considered Madonna's music videos for "Express Yourself" and "Papa Don't Preach" (1986) more controversial, but deemed "Justify My Love" as her most pretentious, stating: "The feminist message of Justify My Love is that Madonna can control a career as shrewdly as any man." Camille Paglia, writing for The New York Times, called Madonna "a true feminist" and deemed the video "truly avant-garde, at a time when that word has lost its meaning in the flabby art world". Nevertheless, she stated that MTV was right to ban it, as "parents cannot possibly control television, with its titanic omnipresence" and that "it does not belong on a mainstream music channel watched around the clock by children". On the other hand, Liz Smith, writing for the Sarasota Herald-Tribune, was critical of the decision, and hoped that since "MTV has gone so moral on the public, that they'll also begin to take close looks at other material submitted to them by all those macho metal and rap groups, with their own S&M overtones, their incipient violence and degradation-of-women themes". She also noted that who admired the singer would applaud her refusal to censor her art, and who never liked her would dislike her more than ever. Richard Goldstein from The Village Voice opined that "by suppressing erotic dissent, MTV does its best to see that this powerful medium will not communicate the 'wrong' idea about sex. That may pacify the puritans, but it also makes it easier to deny women and gays their full humanity—easier for the metal masses to justify their hate", concluding that "'Justify My Love' makes it harder to hurt people". Johns Hopkins University professor of popular culture Mark Crispin Miller observed that it was "perfectly all right for MTV to broadcast sadomasochism couplings and events as long as the images don't violate a certain heterosexual norm". Considine agreed, stating that there was "very little" in the clip that had not been seen on MTV:
"Bare breasts? Put a black bar across 'em, and they'll easily make the cut. In fact, when R.E.M. had a shirtless Michael Stipe lip-syncing along with three topless women for 'Pop Song 89,' not only were the women's nipples masked, but Stipe's were as well. Androgyny? Obviously, Boy George blazed a good bit of ground in that department. But even more to the point was Aerosmith's heavily-played 'Dude (Looks Like a Lady)' clip, which featured an abundance of gender bending."

Benjamin Svetkey from Entertainment Weekly pointed out that "MTV has banned videos before, but this time the network was saying no to the world’s most powerful recording artist. Madonna's sex-charged career has been carved out of controversy, and now, for the first time, the hippest cultural outlet on television was telling her to cool it." Sharing a similar opinion, Lisa Henderson, writing in the book The Madonna Connection: Representational Politics, Subcultural Identities, And Cultural Theory, stated that for critics and fans, "it was an odd scenario—MTV rejecting its premier pop star, whose stylistic developments had arguably marked (and marketed) the evolution of music television itself". Considine wrote in the book The Madonna Companion: Two Decades of Commentary that the banning "immediately mushroomed into a censorship scandal", as "Madonna insisted that she hadn't caused the commotion intentionally", but "her critics accused her of planning the whole thing. Nobody doubted her intelligence then—they merely held it against her." In Justify My Love: Sex, Subversion, and Music Video, Ryann Donnelly wrote that "while the banning of Madonna's Justify My Love video for its explicit sexual content has become somewhat legendary — a sufficient promotional tool in itself — few artists could have sacrificed the support of MTV in a similar way to that of Madonna, before YouTube." Commenting on the video's release as a video single, Landon Palmer stated in Rock Star/Movie Star: Power and Performance in Cinematic Rock Stardom that "the release of 'Justify My Love' exclusively on VHS had the effect of creating a new moving image platform – the 'video single' – for Madonna's cultural production, extending the narrowcast relationship between artist and audience popularized by MTV."

The video's bisexual and sadomasochist themes also were noted. In another article, Paglia recalled that "in a number of videos, Madonna has played with bisexual innuendos", and "Justify My Love" was a culmination of that; she considered that Madonna was a pioneer for "restoring lesbian eroticism to the continuum of heterosexual response" in the clip, showing "bisexuality and all experimentation as a liberation from false, narrow categories". Lucy O'Brien, in her book She Bop II: The Definitive History of Women in Rock, Pop and Soul, wrote that "conveying the full power of sexual ambiguity", Madonna showed in the video "how gender roles could be swapped, blurred and played with to create a multitude of different identities". According to Janelle L. Wilson and Gerald E. Markle, the eroticism shown in the video was "by traditional standards, non-normative. The effeminate dancer, the homosexual behavior and the action and appearance of the masculine woman in the video also represent behavior outside the accepted norms". For Cathy Schwichtenberg, Madonna's "languid French kiss with l'autre femme" in the video was a representation of "a deconstruction of lines and boundaries that fragment male/female gender polarities and pluralize sexual practices. This is a postmodern, unbounded feminism, that unifies coalitionally rather than foundationally". According to Tim Dean in the book Beyond Sexuality, the music video was "replete with stylized gestures of representing the whole catalogue of perverse activity: lesbianism, fetishism, voyeurism, transvestism, troilism, and the ritual accoutrements of sadomasochism".

Reflecting on the video for "Justify My Love" in a retrospective review, Tom Breiham from Stereogum pointed out that the video, rather than the song, became the story, as the "banned-from-MTV furor became an essential piece of Madonna lore — one more time that Madonna made the entire media industrial complex serve her interests." Daniel Browne, writing for The Gay UK website, cited five reasons for calling the video a "masterpiece", such as sex, gender bending, and gay and lesbian romping, describing it as "five minutes of artistic brilliance. I cannot think of a video before or since that covers such a topic in a positive and empowering way. The act of sex in its various forms, cross-dressing and fluid sexuality tend to kept behind closed doors." In a similar vein, Dig!s Mark Elliott went on to say that "the gender fluidity and nudity featured in the new video were provocative enough in a more sheltered era, but the fact it was being issued by such a major star was extraordinary", citing George Michael's "I Want Your Sex" (1987) as an example of a video that had explored similar thematic territory but was altogether more conventional in its approach. Samantha Grossman from Time observed that "if YouTube had existed when 'Justify My Love' was released in 1990, the extremely NSFW music video would have gone viral in minutes, if not seconds". In 2015, Christopher Rosa of VH1 showed the music video to five people around the age of twenty, later interviewing them on their thoughts after watching it. All five of them agreed that it was "certainly envelope-pushing", but also pointed out that "it's nothing 2015 artists haven't done (or even surpassed)", with the author citing the film Fifty Shades of Grey and Nicki Minaj's music video for "Anaconda" (2014) as examples. Additionally, it was later added to sexiest music videos of all time lists by VH1, Rolling Stone, and Marie Claire.

Live performances

Madonna performed "Justify My Love" for the first time on the Girlie Show tour in 1993 during the concert's encore. For the performance, the singer and her dancers wore period costumes, mocking specifically Victorian fashion, while she held a lorgnette. New York Daily News Jim Farber commented that Madonna and the dancers "cavorted elegantly" throughout the number, reversing expectations that the performance for the song would be raunchy. Richard Corliss from Time magazine complimented the performance, opining that the singer saved "her best anachronistic joke for last", noting its "stately cadence" and comparing the costumes to those of My Fair Lady. "The Beast Within" remix was also used on the tour as an interlude with two male dancers performing an apocalyptic dance, miming couplings and brawls while Madonna, from off-stage, recited the lyrics. Jon Pareles from The New York Times considered the performance an "ambiguous sequence, mourning the sexual freedom of the pre-AIDS 1970's, then hinting at biblical retribution". These two performances on the November 19, 1993 show at Sydney Cricket Ground was recorded and released on VHS and Laserdisc on April 26, 1994, as The Girlie Show: Live Down Under. 

"The Beast Within" remix was again used as the video introduction to the 2004 Re-Invention World Tour, including imagery of Madonna from her exhibition in collaboration with Steven Klein, X-STaTIC Pro=CeSS, prior to her appearing on stage. Chart Attack magazine staff noted its "quasi-religious mumbo-jumbo" paired with "some genuinely arty images of the singer" on the screens, while Sal Cinquemani from Slant Magazine found the introduction "macabre". It was subsequently included on the 2006 documentary and live album, I'm Going to Tell You a Secret. "Justify My Love" was later used as a video interlude during The MDNA Tour in 2012. The performance featured dancers wearing white pierrot masks, who "impressed with their fully synchronized dance moves", according to Danilo Saraiva from Quem magazine. The video, directed by Tom Munro, featured a lingerie-clad Madonna. The number was included in the live album MDNA World Tour, released on September 6, 2013. Elements of the song were also used during the "S.E.X." interlude on the Rebel Heart Tour in 2015–16, as dancers writhe on "gravity-defying" beds. The performance of the song at the March 19–20, 2016 shows in Sydney's Allphones Arena was recorded and released in Madonna's fifth live album, Rebel Heart Tour.

Usage in media, covers and samples

On May 11, 1991, Madonna made a guest appearance on Saturday Night Live on the recurring sketch Wayne's World; it spoofed the song's music video as well as her documentary Madonna: Truth or Dare. It consisted on Wayne (Mike Myers) and Garth (Dana Carvey) encountering a seductive Madonna lying on a bed in a hotel room during a fantasy dream sequence, filmed in black and white. After some back-and-forth banter, Wayne and Madonna play truth or dare. Wayne begins by saying "truth". Madonna then asks "Have you ever made love with two women at the same time?" He answers "Uh... yes!" to which Madonna says "Okay, I believe you... Not!" Wayne then dares Madonna to make out with him. As they kiss, the music for "Justify My Love" begins playing. The scene ends as two dominatrixes appear in the room, accompanied by a Prince lookalike.

In 1999, a cover of the song, done by Front Line Assembly with vocals by Kristy Thirsk, was included on the compilation album Virgin Voices: A Tribute To Madonna, Vol. 1. The next year, it received cover versions included on the tribute albums Truly Blue: Tribute to Madonna and A Tribute to Madonna: Tranceformed. "Justify My Love" was also covered by rapper Vita, featuring singer Ashanti, for the The Fast and the Furious soundtrack in 2001, while the same year another cover version by Starsound Orchestra was included on the tribute album Plays the Hits Made Famous by Madonna. In 2012, Brazilian singer Gretchen recorded a cover with a music video using footage of her own acting career. In 2020, Chavez released her own version of "Justify My Love" on streaming platforms. Two years later, she released a limited edition cassette with eight remixes.

German band Enigma sampled one of the remixes of the song for their "Orthodox Remix" of the 1991 single, "Mea Culpa (Part II)". In 1994, Eurodance act Maxx sampled its beat in the song "Suddenly", included on their debut studio album To the Maxximum. German electronic duo Jam & Spoon sampled a part of its remixes for a remix of "Kaleidoscope Skies" (1997), featuring Plavka. Rapper Mase used a sample from "Justify My Love" on his song "Stay Out of My Way", included on his second studio album, Double Up (1999). In 2003, rapper Jay-Z also sampled the song on "Justify My Thug", on his eighth studio album, The Black Album, described as a "hip hop re-working" of the original song. Portions of "Justify My Love" were used by Insane Clown Posse in their 2004 single "Bowling Balls".

Credits and personnel
Credits adapted from The Immaculate Collection liner notes.

Management
 Recorded at Waterfront Studios and Unique Recording Studios, London, United Kingdom and New York City, New York
 Mastered at Sterling Sound Studios, New York City, New York
 Mixed at Guerilla Studios, London, United Kingdom
 Freddy DeMann Management, The DeMann Entertainment Co. Ltd.
 Miss Bessie Music, Webo Girl Publishing, Inc., Warner Bros. Music Corp, Bleu Disc Music Co. Inc (ASCAP)

Personnel

 Madonna – vocals, writer,  background vocals
 Lenny Kravitz – writer, producer, background vocals
 André Betts – associate producer
 Henry Hirsch – recording
 David Domanich – recording
 Andy Cardenas – recording
 Josh Cuervokas – recording
 Shep Pettibone – audio mixing
 Goh Hotoda – audio mixing
 Patrick Demarchelier – photographer
 Jeri Heiden – art director

Track listing and formats 

US and UK cassette and 7-inch single; Japanese mini CD single
 "Justify My Love" (album version) – 4:58
 "Express Yourself" (Shep's 'Spressin' Himself Re-Remix) – 4:02

US Digipak CD maxi-single
 "Justify My Love" (Q-Sound Mix) – 4:54
 "Justify My Love" (Orbit 12-inch mix) – 7:16
 "Justify My Love" (hip hop mix) – 6:30
 "Express Yourself" (1990) (Shep's 'Spressin' Himself Re-Remix) – 9:30
 "Justify My Love" (The Beast Within Mix) – 6:10

Canadian and Australian 12-inch single
 "Justify My Love" (Orbit 12-inch mix) – 7:16
 "Justify My Love" (hip hop mix) – 6:30
 "Justify My Love" (The Beast Within Mix) – 6:10
 "Express Yourself" (1990) (Shep's 'Spressin' Himself Re-Remix) – 9:30

European 12-inch and CD maxi-single
 "Justify My Love" (hip hop mix) – 6:30
 "Justify My Love" (Q-Sound Mix) – 4:54
 "Justify My Love" (The Beast Within Mix) – 6:10

UK and European CD single; UK limited-edition 12-inch picture disc
 "Justify My Love" (William Orbit Remix) – 7:07
 "Justify My Love" (album version) – 4:58
 "Express Yourself" (Shep's 'Spressin' Himself Re-Remix) – 4:02

Digital single

 "Justify My Love" (Q-Sound Mix) – 4:54
 "Justify My Love" (Orbit 12-inch mix) – 7:16
 "Justify My Love" (hip hop mix) – 6:30
 "Express Yourself" (1990) (Shep's 'Spressin' Himself Re-Remix) – 9:30
 "Justify My Love" (The Beast Within Mix) – 6:10
 "Justify My Love" (Orbit edit) – 4:33

Charts

Weekly charts

Year-end charts

Certifications and sales 

!scope="col" colspan="3"|Physical
|-

!scope="col" colspan="3"|Video single
|-

See also 
Pazz & Jop
List of Cash Box Top 100 number-one singles of 1990
List of Cash Box Top 100 number-one singles of 1991

References

Book sources

Madonna songs
Madonna video albums
1990 singles
1990 songs
1990 video albums
Billboard Hot 100 number-one singles
Cashbox number-one singles
Censorship in the arts
Obscenity controversies in music
Songs written by Lenny Kravitz
Songs written by Madonna
Song recordings produced by Lenny Kravitz
Song recordings produced by André Betts
RPM Top Singles number-one singles
Music video compilation albums
Music videos directed by Jean-Baptiste Mondino
Number-one singles in Finland
Sire Records singles
Warner Records singles
Black-and-white music videos
Music video controversies
Songs based on poems
Religious controversies in music